Chou Pin-chin is a Taiwanese former actor.

Chou's film debut in Hou Hsiao-hsien's  (1982), saw him portray a child with a limp. He was the Best Child Actor at the 19th Golden Horse Awards.

References

Living people
Year of birth missing (living people)
Taiwanese child actors
20th-century Taiwanese male actors
Taiwanese male film actors